Vaught–Hemingway Stadium at Hollingsworth Field is an outdoor athletic stadium located in University, Mississippi, United States (although it has an Oxford address). The stadium serves as the home for the University of Mississippi Rebels college football team. The stadium is named after Johnny Vaught and Judge William Hemingway. Since its expansion in 2016, it is the largest stadium in the state of Mississippi with a capacity of 64,038 and also holds the state record for attendance at 66,176.

History

Building of the stadium started in 1915 as a federally sponsored project. A series of expansions and renovations have gradually expanded the stadium and modernized its amenities, allowing the Rebels to play all of their home games on campus. The Ole Miss-MSU game, commonly referred to as the Egg Bowl, was held in Jackson every year from 1973 through 1990 before returning to a home-and-home series.

Namesake
When the stadium opened, it was named for Judge William Hemingway, a professor of law and chairman of the university's committee on athletics. October 12, 1982 saw the addition of legendary Ole Miss coach Johnny Vaught's name to the stadium. September 5, 1998 saw the field named for longtime supporter Dr. Jerry Hollingsworth, bringing the current official title to Vaught-Hemingway Stadium at Hollingsworth Field.

Expansions and upgrades
In 2002, construction crews replaced the south end zone bleachers with a rounded bowl, adding luxury boxes and covered club seating in an upper deck, as well as additional general admission seating for students and season ticket holders; these renovations expanded seating capacity by nearly 10,000, giving Vaught-Hemingway a capacity of 60,580. In August 2011 the school announced Forward Together, a new capital campaign that would seek to build a new basketball arena and expand the stadium. Phase 1 of the campaign includes adding 30 luxury suites and 770 club level seats. In addition new stadium lights, sound system, and 2 new video boards will be added to the current south end zone. Phase 2 calls for the stadium's capacity to increase giving it the ability to hold 64,038 fans. This would be done through closing off the north endzone. In addition a plaza would be built outside the north endzone to serve as a "front door" to the stadium and celebrate Ole Miss tradition and history. In the summer of 2012 Ole Miss announced that they had received a million-dollar gift that was to be used in the Forward Together capital campaign. The school announced in honor of the gift they would start a new tradition and include a bell tower in the north endzone expansion that would be rung before Ole Miss games to let fans know the game is starting soon and after Ole Miss victories. The most recent expansion, completed in 2016, completed the stadium's bowl shape and added 3,458 additional seats.  This brought the total capacity to 64,038 making Vaught-Hemmingway the largest stadium in the state of Mississippi.

Other notable upgrades include the installation of lights in 1990, a Jumbotron in 1997 and the replacement of the natural grass turf, which had become increasingly hard to maintain, with an AstroPlay artificial turf surface in 2003. Ironically, the stadium had been among the first in the nation to switch from a natural grass playing surface to artificial turf in 1970, and then one of the first of those stadiums to switch back to natural grass in 1984. The field surface was again changed in 2009 from AstroPlay to FieldTurf, making Ole Miss the first team in the Southeastern Conference to play their home games on the surface.  In 2016, the stadium's field surface was changed back to natural grass for the third time.

Attendance record

Manning Center indoor practice facility
In 2004, a  indoor practice facility and locker room facility was opened. This facility is linked to the existing stadium via a secured tunnel.

Video display

For the 2008 season, Vaught–Hemingway Stadium got a new HD Daktronics video board to replace the Sony Jumbotron that had been installed in the north Endzone in 1997. Ole Miss' board cost $6 million, all of which was paid for by Telesouth Communications as part of a multimedia rights agreement with the university.

In 2016, Vaught-Hemingway upgraded to three new 13mm pixel HD video boards by Daktronics. The North board measures 48 ft (14 m) by 104.5 ft (31 m) (5,016 square feet) and the two South boards measure 30 ft (9 m) by 49 ft (15 m) (1,470 square feet).

Concerts

See also
 The Grove
 List of NCAA Division I FBS football stadiums

References

External links
Video: Vaught Hemingway expansion for 2016
Vaught-Hemingway Stadium/Hollingsworth Field at olemisssports.com
Video: Virtual tour of Vaught-Hemingway Stadium at Ole Miss
VaughtHemingway.com - Seating charts, photos, & history
Daktronics Ole Miss page

College football venues
American football venues in Mississippi
Ole Miss Rebels football
Buildings and structures in Lafayette County, Mississippi